Following is a list of protected areas where fossils are preserved, known as fossil parks or fossil reserves, worldwide by country.

Africa

Egypt
Wadi Al-Hitan - Valley of The Whales, Fayyoum, Western Desert

South Africa
West Coast Fossil Park, Langebaanweg, Western Cape

Tanzania

Asia

India

There are two geological parks maintained by the Geological Survey of India:

Shivalik Fossil Park, Saketi, H.P.
Mandla Plant Fossils National Park

Japan

Sendai City Tomizawa Site Museum houses a fossilized forest and human artifacts

Thailand

Australia

Australia

Victoria
Dinosaur Dreaming
Dinosaur Cove

Queensland
Riversleigh

South Australia
 Lake Callabonna Fossil Reserve
Lake Ngapakaldi to Lake Palankarinna Fossil Area
 Maslin Bay - Aldinga Bay Geological Site
Naracoorte Caves National Park
 Nilpena Ediacara National Park
 Willalinchina Sandstone Fossil Flora site, near Woomera

North America

Canada
Ancient Echoes Interpretive Centre, Saskatchewan
Dinosaur Provincial Park, Alberta
Driftwood Canyon Provincial Park, British Columbia
Yoho National Park (Burgess Shale) UNESCO site, British Columbia
Joggins Fossil Cliffs UNESCO site, Nova Scotia
McAbee Fossil Beds Heritage Site
Parc national de Miguasha UNESCO site, Quebec

United States

Arizona
Petrified Forest National Park

California
La Brea Tar Pits
Petrified Forest, Calistoga CA

Colorado
Dinosaur National Monument, in Northwest Colorado and North-East Utah.
Dinosaur Ridge
Florissant Fossil Beds National Monument

Connecticut
Dinosaur State Park and Arboretum

Florida
Windley Key Fossil Reef Geological State Park

Idaho
Hagerman Fossil Beds National Monument

Indiana
Falls of the Ohio State Park

Iowa
 Fossil and Prairie Park
Fossilized leaves are one of many found here.
 Devonian Fossil Gorge at Coralville Lake

Maryland
Dinosaur Park

Massachusetts
Dinosaur Footprints

Michigan
Rockport Quarry, an abandoned limestone quarry near Alpena open to collecting

Mississippi
Mississippi Petrified Forest

Nebraska
Agate Fossil Beds National Monument
Ashfall State Historical Park

Nevada
 Tule Springs Fossil Beds National Monument

New Jersey
Poricy Park

New Mexico
Clayton Lake State Park
Prehistoric Trackways National Monument
New York

Penn Dixie Fossil Park & Nature Reserve

Ohio
Hueston Woods State Park
Trammel Fossil Park, Sharonville, Ohio

Oregon
John Day Fossil Beds National Monument

South Dakota
The Mammoth Site
Fossil Cycad National Monument (No longer exists)

Texas
 Dinosaur Valley State Park
 Ladonia Fossil Park, Ladonia, Texas
 Mineral Wells Fossil Park, Mineral Wells, Texas

Utah
Dinosaur National Monument
Escalante Petrified Forest State Park
Prehistoric Trackways National Monument

Wyoming
Fossil Butte National Monument
Red Gulch Dinosaur Tracksite
Yellowstone National Park

South America and Central America

Argentina
Ischigualasto is located in San Juan province

Bolivia
Cal Orcko in Sucre

Brazil
Paleorrota Geopark is located in Rio Grande do Sul.

See also

 Paleontology the study of fossils
 Fossils
 Prehistoric life
 Timeline of geography, paleontology, biology
 Synchrotron X-ray tomographic microscopy
 Fossil Parks
 Fossil Parks of India
 Geology
 Dinosaurs
 List of zoos
 List of aquaria
 List of botanical gardens
 List of fossil sites (with link directory)

References

Lists of buildings and structures
Lists of parks
Paleontological sites
Paleontology lists
Fossil parks
Lists of protected areas